Boronda is an unincorporated community and census-designated place (CDP) in Monterey County, California, United States. The population was 1,760 at the 2020 census. Boronda is located directly west of Salinas and is named after José Eusebio Boronda, a Californio ranchero, and located on the lands of his Rancho Rincón del Sanjón.

Geography

It is bordered to the east by the city of Salinas, the Monterey county seat.

Demographics

2010
The 2010 United States Census reported that Boronda had a population of 1,710. The racial makeup of Boronda was 661 (38.7%) White, 10 (0.6%) African American, 26 (1.5%) Native American, 116 (6.8%) Asian, 7 (0.4%) Pacific Islander, 774 (45.3%) from other races, and 116 (6.8%) from two or more races. Hispanic or Latino of any race were 1,457 persons (85.2%).

The Census reported that 1,710 people (100% of the population) lived in households, 0 (0%) lived in non-institutionalized group quarters, and 0 (0%) were institutionalized.

There were 394 households, out of which 237 (60.2%) had children under the age of 18 living in them, 227 (57.6%) were opposite-sex married couples living together, 83 (21.1%) had a female householder with no husband present, 30 (7.6%) had a male householder with no wife present.  There were 29 (7.4%) unmarried opposite-sex partnerships, and 2 (0.5%) same-sex married couples or partnerships. 41 households (10.4%) were made up of individuals, and 15 (3.8%) had someone living alone who was 65 years of age or older. The average household size was 4.34.  There were 340 families (86.3% of all households); the average family size was 4.52.

The population was spread out, with 558 people (32.6%) under the age of 18, 224 people (13.1%) aged 18 to 24, 476 people (27.8%) aged 25 to 44, 334 people (19.5%) aged 45 to 64, and 118 people (6.9%) who were 65 years of age or older.  The median age was 27.2 years. For every 100 females, there were 102.4 males.  For every 100 females age 18 and over, there were 102.1 males.

The homeowner vacancy rate was 4.7%; the rental vacancy rate was 3.2%.  778 people (45.5% of the population) lived in owner-occupied housing units and 932 people (54.5%) lived in rental housing units.

2000
As of the census of 2000, there were 1,325 people, 309 households, and 269 families residing in the CDP. The racial makeup of the CDP was 32.08% White, 1.74% Black or African American, 2.26% Native American, 9.74% Asian, 0.60% Pacific Islander, 44.08% from other races, and 9.51% from two or more races.  72.53% of the population were Hispanic or Latino of any race.

There were 309 households, out of which 53.1% had children under the age of 18 living with them, 63.8% were married couples living together, 13.3% had a female householder with no husband present, and 12.9% were non-families. 9.7% of all households were made up of individuals, and 2.9% had someone living alone who was 65 years of age or older.  The average household size was 4.27 and the average family size was 4.42.

In the CDP, the population was spread out, with 35.0% under the age of 18, 11.0% from 18 to 24, 29.6% from 25 to 44, 14.7% from 45 to 64, and 9.7% who were 65 years of age or older.  The median age was 28 years. For every 100 females, there were 109.3 males.  For every 100 females age 18 and over, there were 104.5 males.

The median income for a household in the CDP was $46,797, and the median income for a family was $43,309. Males had a median income of $26,089 versus $22,692 for females. The per capita income for the CDP was $15,365.  About 7.6% of families and 10.9% of the population were below the poverty line, including 7.6% of those under age 18 and 20.7% of those age 65 or over.

Schools 
Boronda currently has two active schools, Boronda Meadows Elementary and Boronda DIA. Boronda Meadows Elementary is part of the Salinas City Elementary School District and was opened in 2005. During the 2005–2006 school year, Boronda Meadows enrolled 571 students in grades K-6. Enrollment for the 2016–17 school year is approximately 730.
Boronda School, 1114 Fontes Lane, was closed at the end of the 2005 school year. Many of the students and staff were transferred to Boronda Meadows. The old Boronda school housed the Monterey County Office of Education's Community Day School from 2007 - 2015. The Salinas City Elementary School District reopened Boronda School in the fall of 2015 as a dual immersion language magnet school. It has been renamed "Dual Immersion Academy Salinas" or DIAS- Boronda and for the 2016–17 school year has approximately 100 students enrolled.

References

External links
Boronda Citizens Advisory Committee
Salinas City Elementary School District
Boronda Meadows Elementary
Boronda DIA

Census-designated places in Monterey County, California
Census-designated places in California